Adelino is a census-designated place in Valencia County, New Mexico, United States. Its population was 783 as of the 2020 census. The Adelino CDP was first made in the 2010 census when it had a population of 823. Prior to 2010, the community was part of the Tome-Adelino CDP.

Adelino contains the historic Miguel E. Baca House, listed on the National Register of Historic Places.

Demographics

Education
Its school district is Belén Consolidated Schools. Belén High School is the district's comprehensive high school.

References

Census-designated places in New Mexico
Census-designated places in Valencia County, New Mexico